Gun to Gun is a 1944 American Warner Bros. Santa Fe Trail short subject romantic western directed by D. Ross Lederman. The film, set on a ranch, stars Robert Shayne, Lupita Tovar and Pedro de Cordoba.

Plot summary

Cast
 Robert Shayne as Steve Randall
 Lupita Tovar as Dolores Diego
 Pedro de Cordoba as Don Diego
 Harry Woods as Land Commissioner Harkness
 Anita Camargo as Lupe

References

External links
 
 
 

1944 films
1944 Western (genre) films
1944 romantic drama films
American Western (genre) films
American romantic drama films
American drama short films
Films directed by D. Ross Lederman
Warner Bros. short films
1940s American films